Amar es para siempre is a long-running Spanish television soap opera.
It is the Antena 3's resumption of La 1's Amar en tiempos revueltos. It premiered in January 2013.

Premise 
Amar es para siempre is a period drama resuming the previous series Amar en tiempos revueltos and its setting around the fictional Plaza de los Frutos. Several performers from Amar en tiempos revueltos appeared in the first season of Amar es para siempre.

The fiction was initially set in 1960.

The 8th season was already set in 1977.

Production and release 
It began airing on 14 January 2013. It reached the 2,000 episode mark on 1 December 2020, during its 9th season.

It has sparked two spinoffs, #Luimelia and Luimelia 77, both revolving about the love story between Amelia and Luisita.

Seasons

Season 1 
Season 1 premiered on 14 January 2013 and ended on 4 September 2013 and consisted of 165 episodes. The principal love story was Inés Saavedra and Mauro Jiménez.

Main cast: Manuel Baqueiro, Nadia de Santiago, Bárbara Goenaga, Marc Clotet, Josep Linuesa, Mónica Estarreado, Aitor Mazo, Rosana Pastor, Josep Julien, Chusa Barbero, Rocío Muñoz, Carmen Conesa, Juan Messeguer, Enrique Berrendero, Anna Barrachina, Ledicia Sola, Elena Furiase, Jaime Puyol, Jaume Ulled, Patxi Freytez, Raquel Infante, Carlos García, Sara Casasnovas, Federico Aguado, Ángela Cremonte, Alfonso Bassave, Asier Etxeandía, Antonio Garrido, Belén López.

Season 2 
Season 2 premiered on 5 September 2013 and ended on 9 September 2014 and consisted of 256 episodes. The principal love story was Valeria Prado and Diego Tudela.

Main cast:  Manuel Baqueiro, Itziar Miranda, José Antonio Sayagües, Nadia de Santiago, Raquel Infante, Federico Aguado, Ángela Cremonte, Alfonso Bassave, Asier Etxeandía, Antonio Garrido, Belén López, Octavi Pujades, Alicia Sanz, Marian Arahuetes, Jordi Rebellón, Jaime Blanch, María Morales, Silvia Alonso, Anna Castillo, Elena Jiménez, Anna Barrachina, Secun de la Rosa.

Season 3 
Season 3 premiered on 10 September 2014 and ended on 3 September 2015 and consisted of 251 episodes. The principal love story was Laura Blasco and Jorge Arteche.

Main cast: Manuel Baqueiro, Itziar Miranda, José Antonio Sayagües, Nadia de Santiago, Federico Aguado, Anna Castillo, Sara Rivero, Juanjo Artero, Ana Milán, Daniel Freire, Javier Hernández, Ferrán Vilajosana, Roger Coma, Fernando Vaquero, Nuria Gago, Chiqui Fernández, Luís Bermejo, Andrea Duro, Miriam Montilla, Álex Martínez, Carolina Lapausa, Laura Domínguez, Pedro Casablanc, Anabel Alonso, Pepón Nieto, Xenia Tostado, Óscar Ladoire, Álex Barahona, Nani Jiménez, Daniel Albaladejo, Alejandro Albarracín, Natalia Rodríguez, Jesús Olmedo.

Season 4 
Season 4 premiered on 4 September 2015 and ended on 5 September 2016 and consisted of 254 episodes. The principal love story was Adela Vázquez and Tomás Contreras.

Main cast: Manuel Baqueiro, Itziar Miranda, José Antonio Sayagües, Anabel Alonso, Alejandro Albarracín, Natalia Rodríguez, Elia Galera, Armando del Río, Juanma Lara, Ana Polvorosa, Toni Cantó, Michelle Calvó, Junio Valverde, Eva Marciel, Javier Mora, Víctor Sevilla, Lucía Martín Abello, Álvaro Monje, Bárbara Mestanza, Lola Herrera, Jorge Sanz, Juanjo Artero, Ana Fernández, Álex Barahona, Nuria Gago.

Season 5 
Season 5 premiered on 6 September 2016 and ended on 11 September 2017 and consisted of 256 episodes. The principal love story was Nuria Salgado and Jaime Novoa.

Main cast: Manuel Baqueiro, Itziar Miranda, José Antonio Sayagües, Anabel Alonso, Lucía Martín Abello, Mariona Ribas, Nancho Novo, Thaïs Blume, Javier Pereira, Miguel Ángel Muñoz, Mariam Hernández, Katia Klein, Gonzalo Kindelán, Gorka Lasaosa, Arturo Querejeta, Óscar Ortuño, Blanca Parés, Iñaki Miramón, Ana Torrent, María José Goyanes, Antonio Molero.

Season 6 
Season 6  premiered on 12 September 2017 and ended on 18 September 2018 and consisted of 256 episodes. The principal love story was Marta Novoa and Diego Durán.
 
Main cast: Manuel Baqueiro, Itziar Miranda, José Antonio Sayagües, Anabel Alonso, Lucía Martín Abello, Mariona Ribas, Iñaki Miramón, Antonio Molero, Fernando Cayo, Sonia Almarcha, Víctor Clavijo, Olivia Molina, Meritxell Calvo, Guillermo Barrientos, Ruth Núñez, Jonás Berami, Jacobo Dicenta, José Luis Torrijo, Sebastián Fernández, Jorge Usón, María Barranco, María Adánez.

Season 7 
Season 7 premiered on 19 September 2018 and ended on 13 September 2019 and consisted of 250 episodes. The protagonist for the season was Ana López.

Season 8 
Season 8 premiered on 16 September 2019 and ended on 2020 and consisted of 96 episodes. The principal love story was Julia Eguía and Guillermo Galán.

Awards and nominations 

|-
| align = "center" | 2019 || 7th  || colspan = "2" | Best Daily Series ||  || 
|-
| align = "center" | 2021 || 8th  || colspan = "2" | Best Daily Series ||  || 
|}

References 

Antena 3 (Spanish TV channel) network series
Spanish television soap operas
2010s Spanish drama television series
2020s Spanish drama television series
2013 Spanish television series debuts
Television series set in the 1960s
Television series set in the 1970s
Television series by Diagonal TV